Cooktown is an unincorporated community in Miller County, in the U.S. state of Georgia.

History
The first permanent settlement at Cooktown was made in 1883 by the Cook family, after whom the community was named.

References

Unincorporated communities in Miller County, Georgia